PHD finger protein 20 is a protein that in humans is encoded by the PHF20 gene.

References

Further reading

External links 
 

Transcription factors